Mons is a commune in the Haute-Garonne department of southwestern France on the edge of the Pyrénées.

Population

See also
Communes of the Haute-Garonne department

References

Communes of Haute-Garonne